Michael Ulrich Hensel is a German architect, researcher and writer. His primary areas of interest and inquiry include performance-oriented architecture, embedded architectures - architecture and environment integration, and advanced data-driven design. His work is located in the intersection between architecture, landscape architecture, urban design, micro-climatology and ecology.

Early life
Hensel was born in Celle, Germany in 1965, and lived during his early years in Cologne. He gained his diploma in architecture from Cologne University of Applied Sciences in 1992, his graduate diploma from the Architectural Association School of Architecture in London in 1993, and his PhD from the University of Reading School of Construction Management and Engineering in 2012.

Career
Hensel has developed a theoretical and methodological approach to architectural design entitled "Performance-oriented Architecture" that incorporates notions such as non-discrete architecture and non-anthropocentric architecture and "Embedded Architectures". Performance-oriented architecture focuses on architecture and environment interaction, while the embedded architectures approach takes this further and focuses on architecture and environment integration.

In 1994 Hensel co-founded the interdisciplinary design network OCEAN. Works of OCEAN are included in the Prints and Photographs Division of the Library of Congress in the United States and the FRAC Centre (Fonds Regional d'Art Contemporain) in Orléans, France and were exhibited in various Venice Architectural Biennials and other high-profile venues.

From 2008 to 2018 Hensel served as founding and acting chairman of the OCEAN Design Research Association OCEAN which was an international not-for-profit association registered in Norway.

From 2011 to 2015 Hensel served as founding and acting chairman of SEA – Sustainable Environment Association an international not-for-profit association in Norway. SEA was an interdisciplinary expert network that pursued systematic, integrative and interdisciplinary inquiry into the human-influenced and built environment and its interaction with the natural environment and local ecosystems with the aim to develop alternative approaches to architectural design and sustainability. In 2015 SEA fused with the OCEAN Design Research Association.

Since 2018 he directs OCEAN Architecture | Environment, a practice located at the intersection of architecture, landscape architecture, urban design, climatology and ecology.

From 2007 to 2011 Hensel served as board member of BIONIS, the Biomimetics Network for Industrial Sustainability. BIONIS was located at the University of Reading. Its mission was to promote the application of Biomimetics in products and services and its use in education and training.

Hensel taught at the Architectural Association School of Architecture in London (1993 to 2009), where was Unit Master of Diploma Unit 4 and where he co-founded and directed the Emergent Technologies and Design Program (EmTech). In this context he directed experimental  design and construction of projects in environmentally sensitive sites in Chilean Patagonia.

From 2008 to 2018 he was Professor for Architecture at Oslo School of Architecture and Design in Norway. From 2011 to 2018 he directed the Research Centre for Architecture and Tectonics together with the Advanced Computational Design Laboratory  at the Oslo School of Architecture and Design. 

Since 2018 he is professor at TU Wien Vienna University of Technology where he heads the department for digital architecture and planning and where he serves as a board member of GCD the Center for Geometry and Computational Design.

Personal life
Hensel's wife and one of his key collaborators is Turkish-born progressive architect and researcher Dr. Defne Sunguroğlu Hensel.

Publications

Michael U. Hensel has authored and edited numerous influential books, edited journals, and authored numerous book chapters, peer-reviewed and invited scientific journal articles and popular journal articles. He is editorial board member of numerous peer-reviewed journals and Springer book series, and advisory board member of TAD journal. From 2008 to 2016 he was frequent contributor to Arch+ Journal, Aachen Office.

Authored Books:

1999. Hensel, M. and Verebes, T. Urbanisations. London: Serial Books Architecture & Urbanism 3.
2010. Hensel, M., Menges, A. and Weinstock, M. Emergent Technologies and Design: A Biological Paradigm for Architecture. London: Routledge. 
2013. Hensel, M. Performance-oriented Architecture – Rethinking Architectural Design and the Built Environment. London: AD Wiley. 
2015. Hensel, M. and Turko, J. Grounds and Envelopes - Reshaping Architecture and the Built Environment. London: Routledge. 

Edited Books:

2006. Hensel, M. and Menges, A. Eds. Morpho-Ecologies. London: AA Publications. 
2009. Hensel, M., Hight, C. and Menges, A. Eds. Space Reader – Heterogeneous Space in Architecture. London: John Wiley and Sons. 
2012. Hensel, M. Ed. Design Innovation for the Built Environment – Research by Design and the Renovation of Practice. London: Routledge. 
2016. Hensel, M. and Nilsson, F. Eds. The Changing Shape of Practice - Integrating Research and Design in Architecture. London: Routledge. 
2019. Hensel, M. and Nilsson, F. Eds. The Changing Shape of Architecture - Further Cases of Integrating Research and Design in Practice. London: Routledge. 

Edited Books in other languages:

2014. Hensel M., Menges A. & Weinstock M. Emergent Technologies and Design: A Biological Paradigm for Architecture. Beijing: China Architecture & Building Press. [Chinese]
2016. Hensel M. Ed. Design Innovation for the Built Environment – Research by Design and the Renovation of Practice. Harbin: Harbin Institute of Technology Press. [Chinese]

Edited Journals:

2004. Hensel, M., Menges, A. and Weinstock, M. Eds. Emergence: Morphogenetic Design Strategies. AD Architectural Design Vol. 74, 3. 
2006. Hensel, M., Menges, A. and Weinstock, M. Eds. Techniques and Technologies in Morphogenetic Design. AD Architectural Design Vol. 76, 2. 
2008. Hensel, M., Kamvari, O., Menges, A. Eds. Performance-Oriented Design: Morpho-Ecological Design, Research and Practice in Architecture. Iranian Architecture Quarterly Vol. 8 No. 31 & 32.
2008. Hensel, M. and Menges, A. Eds. Versatility and Vicissitude – Performance in Morpho-Ecological Design. AD Architectural Design Vol. 78, 2. 
2008. Hensel, M. and Menges, A. Eds. Form Follows Performance – Zur Wechselwirkung von Material, Struktur, Umwelt. Arch+ 188. ISSN 0587-3452
2010. Ertas, H., Hensel, M. and Sunguroğlu Hensel, D. Eds. Turkey: At the Threshold. AD Architectural Design Vol. 80, 1. 
2012. Hensel, M. and Gharleghi, M. Eds. Iran – Past, Present and Futures. London: AD Wiley. 
2015. Hensel, M. and Hermansen Cordua, C. Eds. Constructions - An Experimental Approach to Intensely Local Architectures. 
2019. Hensel, M., Suguroglu Hensel, D. and Sevaldson, B. Eds. RSD6 FORMAkademisk - Linking Systems-thinking and Design-thinking in Architecture and Urban Design.

Book Chapters:

2000. Hensel, M. 'Ruptures, Fluctuations and Exchange: Speculations on Gradient Threshold Models'. In Strategic Space - Urbanity in the twenty-first Century. Frankfurt: Anabas Verlag. 157-161.
2003. Hensel, M. 'Re:Cognition – Approaching the Generative Function of the Unfamiliar'. In: Communication & Cognition 36 (3&4): 243–261.
2006. Hensel, M. & Menges, A. ’Morpho-Ecologies: Towards an inclusive Discourse of Heterogeneous Space’. In Morpho-Ecologies, London: AA Publications, 16-60.
2007. Hensel M. & Menges A. ‘Nested Capacities, Gradient Thresholds and Modulated Environments: Towards differentiated multi-performative Architectures’. Softspace: From a Representation of Form to a Simulation of Space, London: Routledge, 52-65.
2009. Hensel M., Hight C. & Menges A. 'En route: Towards a Discourse on Heterogeneous Space beyond Modernist Space-Time and Post-modernist Social Geography'. Heterogeneous Space in Architecture: A Reader, London: John Wiley & Sons, 09-37.
2009. Hensel M. & Menges A. 'The Heterogeneous Space of Morpho-Ecologies'. Heterogeneous Space in Architecture: A Reader, London: John Wiley & Sons, 195-215.
2009. Hensel M. ‘Performance-oriented Design’. Arquitecturas Geneticas III - Genetic Architectures III, Santa Fe NM: SITES Books, 136-149.
2010. Hensel, M. 'Material Systems and Environmental Feedback Dynamics'. In: Emergent Technologies and Design: A Biological Paradigm for Architecture (Hensel, M., Menges, A., Weinstock, M.). London: Routledge. 63–81.
2012. Hensel, M. 'Modeling Modeling – Trajectories in Developing Instrumental Design Processes'. In: Persistent Modeling (Ed. P. Ayres). London: Routledge.
2012. Hensel, M. 'Performance-oriented Design from a Material Perspective – Domains of Agency and the Spatial and Material Organization Complex'. In: Performalism (Eds. E. Neuman and Y. Grobman). London: Routledge. 43–48.
2012. Hensel, M. 'Performance-oriented Design as a Framework for Renovating Architectural Practice and Innovating Research by Design'. In: Design Innovation for the Built Environment – Research by Design and the Renovation of Practice. London: Routledge. 121-143.
2012. Hensel M. ‘The Research Centre for Architecture and Tectonics at the Oslo School of Architecture and Design’. Design Innovation for the Built Environment – Research by Design and the Renovation of Practice, London: Routledge, 145-160.
2012. Hensel, M.  'Unforeseen Trajectories - The Architectural Journey's of Helen & Hard'. In: Helen & Hard. Ostfildern: Hatje Cantz.
2012. Hensel M., Sunguroğlu Hensel D. & Turko J. ‘Research in the context of the OCEAN Design Research Association’. Design Innovation for the Built Environment – Research by Design and the Renovation of Practice, London: Routledge, 91-106.
2016. Hensel, M. & Nilsson, F. ‘Introduction: The Changing Shape of Practice’ The Changing Shape of Practice - Integrating Research and Design in Architecture. London: Routledge, xiv-xviii.
2016. Hensel M. & Sunguroğlu Hensel, D. ‘The Future Practices of OCEAN’. The Changing Shape of Practice - Integrating Research and Design in Architecture. London: Routledge, 168-180.
2017. Hensel M. ‘Farewell Architecture – Rest in Pieces? Means of Overcoming The Impact of Architectural Education as Risk-Diminishing Service Industry’ Mimari Tasarim Eğitimine Çağdas Önermeler. Istanbul: YEM Yayin, 47-60.
2018. Hensel M. ‘The Changing Shape of Practice – A multi-level Project’. Unterrainer W. Ed. Emerging Architectures – The Changing Shape of Architectural Practices. Aarhus: Arkitektskolens Forlag, 116-120.
2019. Hensel M. & Nilsson F. ‘Current Changes in Conditions and Contexts for Architectural Research in Practice – A brief Introduction’. The Changing Shape of Architecture – Further Cases of Integrating Research and Design in Practice. London: Routledge.
2019. Hensel M. ‘Evolving Contours in Rethinking, Reskilling, Retooling – Life-long Learning, Research Capacities and Lateral Networking’ The Changing Shape of Architecture – Further Cases of Integrating Research and Design in Practice. London: Routledge.
2019. Hensel M. & Stangeland S. ‘The Relational Designs of Helen & Hard’. The Changing Shape of Architecture – Further Cases of Integrating Research and Design in Practice. London: Routledge.
2019. Hensel M. ‘In <> Out of the Void’. The Changing Shape of Architecture – Further Cases of Integrating Research and Design in Practice. London: Routledge.

Scientific Journal Articles:

2000. Bettum J. & Hensel M. ‘Channelling Systems: Dynamic Processes and Digital Time-Based Methods in Urban Design’, Contemporary Processes in Architecture, AD Architectural Design Vol. Vol. 70 (3): 36-41.
2002. Hensel M. & Sotamaa K. ‘Vigorous Environments’. Contemporary Techniques in Architecture, AD Architectural Design Vol. 72, 1: 34-41.
2003. Hensel M.‘Re: Cognition – Approaching the Generative Function of the Unfamiliar’. Communication & Cognition Vol. 36 (3&4): 243-261.
2004. Hensel M. ‘Digital Architectures: Are We Ready to Compute?’, Digital Tectonics, London: Wiley-Academy, 120-126.
2004. Hensel M. ‘Finding Exotic Form: An Evolution of Form-finding as a Design Method’. Emergence: Morphogenetic Design Strategies, AD Architectural Design Vol. 74 (3): 26 – 33.
2004. Hensel M., Menges A. & Weinstock M. ‘Emergence in Architecture’. Emergence: Morphogenetic Design Strategies, AD Architectural Design Vol. 74 (3): 06-09.
2004. Hensel M., Menges A. & Weinstock M. 'Fit Fabric: Versatility through Redundancy and Differentiation’. Emergence: Morphogenetic Design Strategies, AD Architectural Design Vol. 74 (3): 40-45.
2006. Hensel M. ‘Towards Self-organisational and Multi-Performance Capacity in Architecture’. Techniques and Technologies in Morphogenetic Design, AD Architectural Design Vol. 76 (2): 05-11.
2006. Hensel M. ‘Computing Self-organisation: Environmentally Sensitive Growth Modelling’. Techniques and Technologies in Morphogenetic Design, AD Architectural Design Vol. 76 (2): 12-17.
2006. Hensel M. ‘{Synthetic} Life-Architectures - Ramifications and Potentials of a literal Biological Paradigm for Architectural Design’. Techniques and Technologies in Morphogenetic Design, AD Architectural Design Vol. 76 (2): 18-25.
2006. Hensel M. & Menges A. ‘Differentiation and Performance: Multi-Performance Architectures and Modulated Environments’. Techniques and Technologies in Morphogenetic Design, AD Architectural Design Vol. 76 (2): 60-69.
2006. Hensel M. & Menges A. ‘Material and Digital Design Synthesis: Integrating material self-organisation, digital morphogenesis, associative parametric modelling and computer-aided manufacturing’. Techniques and Technologies in Morphogenetic Design, AD Architectural Design Vol. 76 (2): 88-95.
2008. Hensel M. & Sunguroğlu D. ‘Material Performance’. Versatility and Vicissitude – Performance in Morpho-Ecological Design, Architectural Design Vol. 78 (2): 34-38.
2008. Hensel M. & Menges A. ‘Designing Morpho-Ecologies – Versatility and Vicissitude of Heterogeneous Space’, Versatility and Vicissitude – Performance in Morpho-Ecological Design, Architectural Design Vol. 78 (2): 102-111.
2008. Hensel M. & Menges A. ‘Aggregates’. Versatility and Vicissitude – Performance in Morpho-Ecological Design, Architectural Design Vol. 78 (2): 80-87.
2008. Hensel M. & Menges A. 'Membrane Spaces’, Versatility and Vicissitude – Performance in Morpho-Ecological Design, Architectural Design Vol. 78 (2): 74-79.
2008. Hensel M. & Menges A. 'Inclusive Performance: Efficiency versus Effectiveness'. Versatility and Vicissitude – Performance in Morpho-Ecological Design, Architectural Design Vol. 78 (2): 54-63.
2008. Hensel M. & Menges A. 'Versatility and Vicissitude: An Introduction to Performance in Morpho-Ecological Design'. Versatility and Vicissitude – Performance in Morpho-Ecological Design, Architectural Design Vol. 78 (2): 6-11.
2009. Hensel M. & Menges A. 'Patterns in Performance-oriented Design – An Approach towards Pattern Recognition, Generation and Instrumentalisation', AD Pattern in Architecture, AD Architectural Design Vol. 79, 6: 88-93.
2010. Hensel M. & Sunguroğlu Hensel D. 'Extended Thresholds I: Nomadism, Settlements and the Defiance of Figure-Ground’. Turkey: At the Threshold, AD Architectural Design Vol. 80 (1): 14-19.
2010. Hensel M. & Sunguroğlu Hensel D. 'Extended Thresholds II: The Articulated Threshold’. Turkey: At the Threshold, AD Architectural Design Vol. 80 (1): 20-25.
2010. Hensel M. & Sunguroğlu Hensel D. 'Extended Thresholds III: Auxiliary Architectures’. Turkey: At the Threshold, AD Architectural Design Vol. 80 (1): 76-83.
2010. Ertas H., Hensel M. & Sunguroğlu Hensel D. 'Turkey – At the Threshold’. Turkey: At the Threshold, AD Architectural Design Vol. 80 (1): 6-13.
2010. Hensel M. ‘Performance-oriented Architecture - Towards a Biological Paradigm for Architectural Design and the Built Environment’. FORMAkademisk – Research Journal for Design and Design Education Vol. 3 (1): 36-56.
2011. Hensel M. ‘Performance-oriented Architecture and the Spatial and Material Organisation Complex - Rethinking the Definition, Role and Performative Capacity of the Spatial and Material Boundaries of the Built Environment’. FORMAkademisk – Research Journal for Design and Design Education Vol. 4 (1): 3-23.
2011. Hensel M. ‘Type? What Type? Further Reflections on the Extended Threshold’. Typological Urbanism – Projective Cities. AD Architectural Design Vol. 81 (1): 56-65.
2012. Hensel M. ‘Practices Abroad: Today’s Diaspora – Tomorrow’s Architecture’. Iran – Past, Present and Futures. AD Architectural Design Vol. 82 (3): 104-119.
2012. Hensel M. ‘Latent Futures of Iranian Architecture’. Iran – Past, Present and Futures. AD Architectural Design Vol. 82 (3): 120-127.
2012. Hensel M. & Gharleghi M. ‘Iran – Past, Present and Future’. Iran – Past, Present and Futures. AD Architectural Design Vol. 82 (3): 16-25.
2012. Hensel M., Sunguroğlu Hensel D., Gharleghi M. & Craig S. ‘Towards an Architectural History of Performance: Auxiliarity, Performance and Provision in Historical Persian Architectures’. Iran – Past, Present and Futures. AD Architectural Design Vol. 82 (3): 26-37.
2012. Hensel M.‘Confronting the Crisis of Architectural Education’. Nordic Journal of Architecture 1 (2): 85-89.
2012. Hensel M. ‘Sustainability from a Performance-oriented Architecture Perspective - Alternative Approaches to Questions regarding the Sustainability of the Built Environment’. Sustainable Development 20 (3): 146-154.
2013. Hensel M. & Sørensen, S. ‘En route to Performance-oriented Architecture - The Research Centre for Architecture and Tectonics: Integrating Architectural Education with Research by Design along a practice-oriented Perspective’. SAJ Serbian Architecture Journal 5 (2): 106-131.
2014. Hensel M. & Sørensen S. ‘Intersecting Knowledge Fields and Integrating Data-Driven Computational Design en Route to Performance-oriented and Intensely Local Architectures’. Footprint 15: 59-74.
2015. Hensel M. 'Thoughts and Experiments en Route to Intensely Local Architectures'. Nordic Journal of Architectural Research 27(1): 61-83.
2015. Hensel M. ‘The Rural Studio – Incarnations of a Design and Build Programme’. Constructions – An Experimental Approach to Intensely Local Architectures. AD Architectural Design Vol. 85 (2): 40-47.
2015. Hensel M. ‘Studio Mumbai – The Practice of Making’. Constructions – An Experimental Approach to Intensely Local Architectures. AD Architectural Design Vol. 85 (2): 94-101.
2015. Hensel M. ‘Auxiliary Architectures: Augmenting Existing Architectures with Performative Capacities’. Constructions – An Experimental Approach to Intensely Local Architectures. AD Architectural Design Vol. 85 (2): 116-119.
2015. Hensel M., Hermansen Cordua C., & Jolly Monge D. ‘The Open City and the e[ad] School of Architecture and Design’. Constructions – An Experimental Approach to Intensely Local Architectures. AD Architectural Design Vol. 85 (2): 34-39.
2015. Hensel M. & Hermansen Cordua C. ‘Outlook – En Route to Intensely Local Architectures and Tectonics’. Constructions – An Experimental Approach to Intensely Local Architectures. AD Architectural Design Vol. 85 (2): 132-135.
2015. Hensel M. & Hermansen Cordua C. ‘The Scarcity and Creativity Studio – Architecture by Latitude and Locality’. Constructions – An Experimental Approach to Intensely Local Architectures. AD Architectural Design Vol. 85 (2): 48-57.
2015. Hensel M. & Hermansen Cordua C. ‘Present and Past Trajectories of Experimental Architectures’. Constructions – An Experimental Approach to Intensely Local Architectures. AD Architectural Design Vol. 85 (2): 16-23.
2015. Hensel M. & Hermansen Cordua C. ‘Introduction – Relating Perceptions of Constructions, Experimental, and Local’. Constructions – An Experimental Approach to Intensely Local Architectures. AD Architectural Design Vol. 85 (2): 8-15.
2017. Hensel M. (2017) ‘Loci of Disruptiveness: Reflections on Ethics at the Dawn of the Technocene’. TAD Technology | Architecture + Design 1 (1): 6-8.
2018. Hensel M., Sunguroğlu Hensel D. & Sørensen S.S. ‘Embedded Architectures: Inquiries into Architectures, Diffuse Heritage and Natural Environments in Search for better informed Design Approaches to Sustainability’. Time + Architecture 3 Vol. 161: 42-45.
2019. Hensel M. ‘The Rights to Ground: Integrating Human and Non-Human Perspectives in an Inclusive Approach to Sustainability’. Sustainable Development 2019: 1-7.
2019. Hensel M. & Sørensen S. ‘Performance-oriented Architecture and Urban Design – Relating Information-based Design and Systems-thinking in Architecture’. FORMAkademisk – Research Journal for Design and Design Education. Vol 12 (2) 1-17.

References

External links
 Ocean-designresearch.net

1965 births
20th-century German architects
Living people
German expatriates in Norway
People from Celle
Academic staff of the Oslo School of Architecture and Design
21st-century German architects